The IIHF U18 World Championship is an annual event organized by the International Ice Hockey Federation for national under-18 ice hockey teams from around the world. The tournament is usually played in April and is organized according to a system similar to the Ice Hockey World Championships and the IIHF World Junior Championship.

History
The United States leads the tournament with ten championships followed by Finland and Canada with four championships, and Russia with three and Sweden with two. Players who do not participate in the World Championship due to their respective league postseasons have the alternative of representing their country in the Hlinka Gretzky Cup in August.

Results
 Number of tournaments (or 2nd placed/3rd places) won at the time.

Medal table

Hosting countries

See also
 IIHF World Ranking
 Ice Hockey World Championships
 World Junior Ice Hockey Championships
 World Junior A Challenge
 World U-17 Hockey Challenge

Notes

External links
All Medalists - U18 - Full results for men's, women's and junior championships since 1999 and medalists for all tournaments.
 2015 official site
 IIHF World U18 all-time scoring leaders

 
International Ice Hockey Federation tournaments
International ice hockey competitions for junior teams
Under-18 ice hockey
April sporting events
U18